Beretta is a surname. Notable people with the surname include:
 Antonio Beretta (1808–1891), first mayor of Milan, 1860–1867
 Bartolomeo Beretta (c. 1490 – c. 1565), founder of the Beretta arms manufacturing company 
 Caterina Beretta (1939–1911), Italian ballet dancer and teacher, the director of La Scala Ballet School from 1905 to 1908
 Daniel Beretta (born 1946), French actor
 Duilio Beretta (born 1992), Peruvian professional tennis player
 Fábio Beretta (born 1986), Brazilian racing driver
 Giacomo Beretta (born 1992), Italian footballer
 Gianna Beretta Molla (1922–1962), canonized as a saint in 2004
Joanne Beretta (1933–2020, American cabaret singer
 Mario Beretta (born 1959), Italian association football manager
 Mark Beretta (born 1966), Australian media personality
 Moreno Beretta (born 1993), Italian footballer
 Olivier Beretta (born 1969), racing driver from Monaco
 Samuele Beretta (born 1990), Italian forward footballer

See also
 Baretta (surname) 
 Barretter (disambiguation)
 Bereta (disambiguation)
 Biretta, a type of hat

Italian-language surnames